The 1989 Roller Hockey World Cup was the twenty-ninth roller hockey world cup, organized by the Fédération Internationale de Roller Sports. It was contested by 12 national teams (6 from Europe, 3 from South America, 1 from North America, 1 from Africa and 1 from Oceania). All the games were played in the city of San Juan, in Argentina, the chosen city to host the World Cup.

Venue

Group stage

Group A

Group B

Final phase

9th to 12th play-off

Final round

Standings

See also 
 FIRS Roller Hockey World Cup

External links 
 1989 World Cup in rink-hockey.net historical database

Roller Hockey World Cup
1989 in Argentine sport
1989 in roller hockey
R